At the 1970 Summer Universiade, the Athletics events were held at the Stadio Comunale in Turin, Italy between 2 and 6 September.

Medal summary

Men

Women

Medal table

References
World Student Games (Universiade - Men) - GBR Athletics
World Student Games (Universiade - Women) - GBR Athletics

 
Athletics at the Summer Universiade
Uni
1970 Summer Universiade